William Ladd (1778–1841) was an American anti-war activist.

William Ladd may also refer to:

William E. Ladd (1880–1967), American surgeon
William F. Ladd (1896–1980), American major general
William Ladd Taylor (1854–1926), American illustrator
William Palmer Ladd (1870–1941), American Episcopal priest and scholar
William S. Ladd (1826–1893), American politician and businessman